Pop Chalee, also known as Merina Lujan (March 20, 1906 – December 11, 1993), was an American painter, muralist, performer, and singer. In 2021, she was inducted into the National Cowgirl Museum and Hall of Fame.

Early years 
Pop Chalee was born on March 20, 1906, in Castle Gate, Utah. Her father, Joseph Cruz Lujan was from Taos and her mother Merea Margherete Luenberger, was predominantly Swiss. Pop Chalee, which means "blue flower", is a Tiwa name given to her by her Taos grandmother soon after birth. In the year that Chalee was born, US President Theodore Roosevelt seized most of Taos Pueblo lands including Blue Lake, which played a vital role in Native American sacred beliefs.

Chalee's early life was fairly chaotic. Early in Chalee's life the Lujan family broke up and moved away from Utah. Chalee was placed in the care of her father's much older half-brother, Santiago Espinoza, who lived at Taos pueblo. Although she was not living with her sisters, they remained close as they were living near each other on the pueblo. After the first summer in Taos, Chalee's father sent the children to the Santa Fe Indian School. As a young teenager, Chalee was on the move again to return to Salt Lake City, Utah.

On the journey back to Utah, she realized that she could not remember what her mother looked like. When they arrived at the station their mother never arrived to get them. After seeking out the help of a family friend they finally found their mother's home but were met with an unwelcome greeting. Chalee recalls their mother turning them away and calling them "little black devils". 

Despite the cold welcome, Chalee would live at her mother's house where she got her first job to contribute to the household. At age 16, Chalee could no longer tolerate the authoritarian and oppressive environment of her mother's house and ran away.

Adult years 
On July 20, 1922, the artist married Otis Fred Hopkins, a European-American craftsman of wood and metal. As she was starting her married life, international interest was growing for Native American art, which was defined more as the subject of Native Americans and not made by Native Americans. While Native American art shows were traveling around the county, Chalee gave birth to her first son at 18 years old; Jack Cruz (also named Kun Funa or Black Buffalo). Less than two years later, her daughter Betty (named Pop Pina or Red Flower) was born.

With her new family, Chalee moved back to Taos but did not participate in the community. She was further separated because of her marriage to an Anglo outsider. However, with Otis' woodworking and metal skills, he was allowed to become part of the community, even more so than Chalee. Although Chalee was reluctant to fully participate in the pueblo, her two children grew up participating in the community, as she and her siblings had.

Only after a year of living back in Taos, that the Hopkins family moved back to Salt Lake City. This pattern of "shifting from one residence to another continued." During the Great Depression, Native American received increasing national attention. Chalee was not yet part of the movement, but instead she made public appearances in LDS churches on Native American life. "These thematically linked her to her Native American culture" and inadvertently portrayed her as a representative for her people. This commitment of public speaking to educate a “white” America about Indian life would continue well into Chalee's later years.

Art career 
Chalee had not considered a career in art until “[a]n unexpected visit in Utah to a fortune teller and a subsequent recurring dream-inspired one of the most dramatic turning points in Pop Chalee's life." The fortune-teller told her that she would break away from Utah and return to Taos. She told Chalee that she would be somebody. This message started Chalee's dreams of returning to Taos.

Shortly after the meeting with the fortune teller, Chalee and her family moved back to New Mexico in the mid-1930s. She went back to the school she had attended over 20 years ago to open a locker she had dreamed about frequently. When she finally arrived at the school and opened the locker she discovered it was empty. However, she realized that this was her chance to be an artist. Not long afterward, she studied painting at the Santa Fe Indian School with Dorothy Dunn.

Chalee started with some difficulty as she was much older than most of the students and the only woman for some time. However, her insecurities about her artwork were put to ease by Dorothy Dunn's supportive encouragement and patience. Chalee seemed to enjoy the school and finally settled into her new role as an artist: "I'd always been kind of funny—I never did anything right. I'd try different things like dancing and couldn't make it. But when I got into the art, I just stuck to it until I finally developed myself, then it just kind of opened the gates and I went on." In Chalee's biography by Margaret Cesa, her progress and involvement at "the Studio could be compared to jumping into a raging river, frightened at first and then later enjoying the speed and power of the rapids so much that she never leaves the water."

At the school, Chalee was exposed to art techniques and art history that strengthened her pride in the work of Native American artists. Responding to a lecture given about modern American art, Chalee commented "Some of our Indian artists paint in a style that the white man says can not be done, but still the Indian gets a perfectly balanced picture and the white artist generally puts a lot of unnecessary lines in a picture. We strive to tell a story in our paintings with as few lines as possible and leave out all unnecessary details. It is all done from memory." Chalee was beginning to form a very clear direction and model for her own artwork.

After finishing her first year, Chalee began to work at the Laboratory of Anthropology as a paid copyist for Kenneth M. Chapman to document designs from the Laboratory's vast collection of Native American pottery. "These tasks served to increase Pop Chalee's appreciation of Native American arts and heighten her pride in her Pueblo heritage." During this time Chalee was also invited to show her work at an exhibit at Stanford and also contribute to the magazine School Arts. This would be the beginning of a very long and celebrated art career.

Reception and influences 
During the 1930s, when Chalee was becoming a household name, there was a "dense thicket of misinformation and sensationalism that circulated" about this new and upcoming artist. She was called Princess Popshilee or Princess Blue Flower, even though there were no Indian Princesses in the pueblos. A late bloomer onto the emerging Native American art scene of the 1930s, she quickly became one of the most successful and sought after artists of her time. This was no small feat, considering she was a woman and much older than most of her peers at the Santa Fe Indian School, where she studied under Dorothy Dunn.

During the Works Progress Administration, she worked for the Indian Division of the Public Works of Art Project, which was funded in 1934. Chalee produced several art works that were distributed around the country (locations unknown.) 

"Her works are included in numerous museum collections, including the Gilcrease Museum (Tulsa, OK), the Heard Museum (Phoenix, AZ), and the Millicent Rogers Museum (Taos, NM). Several of her murals are permanently displayed at the Albuquerque Airport."  Her mural work is also on the entrance walls of Maisel's Trading Post on Central Avenue in Albuquerque, generated with several Native and non-native painters in 1939.

Known for her mystical horses and enchanted forests, she also painted scenes from her participation in the Native American Church at Taos. Her paintings can be described as ephemeral. "Pop Chalee transformed a traditional style of painting to create magical, idyllic images of wide-eyed animals, ceremonial figures, and woodland settings."

In her mythical horse paintings, Chalee paints a dreamlike and whimsical horse. Although space is rendered in a clearly two-dimensional style, the horses have such energy and movement. "Her treatment of the horse is mythically stylized with elongated legs and long swirling manes and tails. These horses evoke a Taos story of a stallion that watches over the Pueblo at night."

In addition to mystical horses, Chalee's forest compositions often teemed with frolicking deer as well. It has been proposed that Pop Chalee's work might well have served as the direct inspiration for the 1942 American animated drama film by Walt Disney, Bambi. Chalee has in fact been called a "Bambi painter." Pop Chalee's magical forest fantasies were exhibited at Stanford University in 1936. It is notable that the sketches for Bambi did not commence until 1937 prior to the film's 1941 release.

Rhythm and movement of ceremonial dance had a strong influence on Chalee and her art; "the rhythm the Indian has, I just go out of this world with it, and the drumbeat, your heart is beating with them, with the rhythm of their bodies". When asked if her life at Taos had an identifiable effect on her art, Chalee replied: "[t]hat I couldn't answer, that I don't know, I really don't know. Maybe an outsider could see it, but..." Whether or not Chalee was aware of her influence from her pueblo community, she was clearly affected by the Taos religion. "Ceremonial life, 'based on a belief in the oneness of all living things', provided her with an opportunity to observe 'the delicate balance of the relationship between man and nature.'" It is clear in all of her work that Chalee felt a strong and deep connection with the world around her and was in touch, not with a specific horse or creature, but rather the spirit of the greater being is represented.

"Museums and galleries sought her exotic and captivating works and she was frequently requested to make personal appearances. Chalee attributed her success as an artist to the encouragement of Mabel Dodge Lujan and the instruction of her admired teacher Dorothy Dunn, to whom she paid tribute throughout her life." While Chalee accredited others for the success of her work, she was also very much a personality and had a wonderful energy that people sought after. In an article published in  Southwest Art magazine, Sally Euclaire describes Chalee as a dynamic woman with an image. "Standing tall at well under 5 feet, she sported full bangs and a waist-length braid, body-hugging Capri pants, high-tech sneakers, and New Age crystal jewelry. She was clearly a woman with an image."

Family and death 
Pop Chalee died on December 11, 1993, in Santa Fe. She was the aunt of a painter, Pop Wea also known as Lori Tanner, who died in 1966. Pop Chalee's great-granddaughter, Maya Chalee Hopkins who was born in 1978, is also an artist and designer and was greatly influenced by her great-grandmother.

Notes

References 
 Broder, Patricia Janis. Earth songs, moon dreams: paintings by American Indian women artists. St Martin's Press. .
 
 
 
 
 
 Lester, Patrick D. The Biographical Directory of Native American Painters. Tulsa, OK: SIRS Publications, 1995. ISBM 0-8061-9936-9.
 

1906 births
1993 deaths
20th-century American women artists
American women painters
20th-century indigenous painters of the Americas
Painters from New Mexico
Taos Pueblo artists
Native American women artists
20th-century American painters
People from Carbon County, Utah
Painters from Utah
American people of Swiss descent
20th-century Native Americans
20th-century Native American women
Native American people from Utah